Diego Moya (born 19 October 1998) is a Chilean triathlete. He competed in the men's event at the 2020 Summer Olympics held in Tokyo, Japan.

He finished in 14th place in the men's triathlon at the 2019 Pan American Games held in Lima, Peru. He also competed in the mixed relay event.

References

External links
 

1998 births
Living people
Chilean male triathletes
Olympic triathletes of Chile
Triathletes at the 2020 Summer Olympics
Sportspeople from Santiago
Pan American Games competitors for Chile
Triathletes at the 2019 Pan American Games
Competitors at the 2022 South American Games
South American Games bronze medalists for Chile
South American Games medalists in triathlon